Mitchell A. "Mitch" Aliotta (May 30, 1944 – July 22, 2015) was an American vocalist and bassist, who was involved in the psychedelic soul movement in Chicago, Illinois, United States. Aliotta played bass guitar in Rotary Connection, and later formed the trio Aliotta Haynes Jeremiah. He died of complications from diabetes and chronic obstructive pulmonary disease in 2015, at the age of 71.  Aliotta had four daughters: Amy Wojdak, Michele Roerig, Margaret “Maggie” Aliotta, and Heather Goldenhersh.

Aliotta was once part of a Chicago based band called the Proper Strangers. In 2015 he died of obstructive pulmonary disease.

Discography
With Rotary Connection
Rotary Connection, 1967
Aladdin, 1968
Peace, 1968
Dinner Music, 1970
Hey Love, 1971 (as the New Rotary Connection)

With Aliotta-Haynes-Jeremiah
Songs
Slippin Away, 1977
Lake Shore Drive, 1995
Lake Shore drive at 25, 1997

With Minnie Ripperton 

 Her Chess years, 1997

With Steve Goodman 

 Gathering at the earl of Oldtown, 1970

References

1944 births
2015 deaths
Guitarists from Chicago
20th-century American bass guitarists